Christian Juttner (born May 20, 1964) is a former American film and television actor. He began his career as a child actor and is best known for his roles in the 1978 films Return from Witch Mountain and I Wanna Hold Your Hand.

Life and career
Juttner was born on May 20, 1964 in Los Angeles, California. While known for his roles in a few Disney films, Juttner also appeared in many television shows throughout the 1970s including Bewitched, Ironside, Emergency!, The Bionic Woman, Wonder Woman, ABC Afterschool Specials, Lou Grant, Trapper John, M.D. and Alice.

He appeared in several other films including Return from Witch Mountain, I Wanna Hold Your Hand and The Swarm.

Since retiring from acting, Juttner has been working as a construction contractor.

Filmography

References

External links
 

1964 births
Living people
American male child actors
American male film actors
American male television actors
Male actors from Los Angeles
People from Los Angeles